Foreign relations between the Kingdom of Bahrain and the Republic of Indonesia were officially established in 1976. Bahrain sees Indonesia as an important market in ASEAN, while Indonesia sees Bahrain as one of the gate to enter Gulf Cooperation Council nations. Indonesia has an embassy in Manama since December 29, 2010, while Bahrain's embassy in Bangkok is also accredited to Indonesia. Both countries are the member of Organization of Islamic Cooperation.

State visit
Indonesian President Abdurrahman Wahid paid an official state visit to Bahrain in June 2000.

Trade
The trade volume between Bahrain and Indonesia has seen a significant increase, from about US$39 million in 2009 to more than US$140 million in 2011.
Indonesian exports to Bahrain includes plywood and other wood products, charcoal, paper, garment, textile and furniture. While Indonesian imports from Bahrain includes iron ores, sodium sulphate, scrap metals such as iron, aluminum, copper, zinc, iron cables, and aluminum products.

Cooperation
Both countries has agreed to foster cooperation in various sectors, include the bilateral inter-parliamentary cooperation, trade, industry, technology, and development of small and medium enterprises. Bahrain in particular are interested to ensure their food security and has shown the interest to invest in Indonesian food commodities.

Migrant workers
Currently there are around 300 thousands Indonesians working in Bahrain.

List of ambassadors

Indonesia to Bahrain

Bahrain to Indonesia

External links
 The Embassy of Republic of Indonesia in Manama, Bahrain

References

 
Bilateral relations of Indonesia
Indonesia